École française de Lausanne-Valmont is a Catholic French international school in Lausanne, Switzerland. It serves levels maternelle (preschool) through terminale, the final year of lycée (sixth form college/senior high school). The Marcelline Sisters of Milan established the school in 1963. As of 2016 it has over 400 students.

Accreditation
École française VL's (upper) secondary education (Middle and High School) is not approved as a Mittelschule/Collège/Liceo by the Swiss Federal State Secretariat for Education, Research and Innovation (SERI).

Notes

External links
 École française de Lausanne-Valmont 

Schools in Lausanne
French international schools in Switzerland
Secondary schools in Switzerland
1963 establishments in Switzerland
Educational institutions established in 1963